Zeynep Ahunbay (born 1946 in Ünye, Ordu Province) is a leading Turkish scholar of antiquities.

Biography
Dr. Ahunbay was born in Ünye, Ordu Province, a small town in the Black Sea region of Turkey.

She received her PhD in architectural history in 1976 from Istanbul Technical University, where in 1988 she became a professor of Architectural History and Preservation.

She has published numerous books on restoration and conservation of cultural heritage. Dr. Ahunbay's best-known works are the restoration of the Zeyrek Mosque (Monastery of the) Pantocrator) with the art historians the professors Metin Ahunbay and Robert Ousterhout, as well as the restoration of Istanbul's city walls.

She was also member of the Commission to preserve national monuments of Bosnia and Herzegovina, from December 2001 to February 2016, when new board was elected for period since 2016.

At the present, she is working on a conservation project for the Haghia Sophia museum in Istanbul and rescue work for the ancient city of Hasankeyf.

See also
 Zeyrek Mosque

References

Sources
 Institut Européen des Itinéraires Culturels - Biography of Zeynep Ahunbay
 ArchNet.org - Zeyrek Church Mosque

1946 births
Living people
People from Ünye
Istanbul Technical University alumni
Academic staff of Istanbul Technical University
Turkish women academics
Turkish women historians
Turkish architects
Conservation architects
20th-century Turkish historians
21st-century Turkish historians